Jill McIntosh is a former Australia netball international and national team head coach. As a player, McIntosh was a member of the Australia team that won the gold medal at the 1983 World Netball Championships. She later coached Australia at the 1995 and 1999 World Netball Championships and at the 1998 and 2002 Commonwealth Games, guiding the team to four gold medals. In 2009 she was inducted into the Australian Netball Hall of Fame. McIntosh subsequently worked as a coach with the International Netball Federation, Central Pulse and with the national teams of Singapore, Northern Ireland and Jamaica.

Early life and family
McIntosh is originally from Perth, Western Australia. She is the daughter of Betty and Merv McIntosh. Her father played Australian rules football for Perth during the 1940s and early 1950s. She has six siblings. As well as playing netball, in her youth McIntosh also represented Western Australia at the  Australian Swimming Championships, winning medals at butterfly and medley events.

Playing career

Clubs
While still in school, McIntosh began playing netball with the Jay Dees Club. Her coaching career began at 15 when, after her team found themselves without a coach, she stepped in and began to lead them. Throughout her playing career she continued to coach the teams she played for. The main club she played for and coached was Bull Creek Netball Club. In 1989, McIntosh was a member of the Coastal Raiders team that won the inaugural West Australian Netball League title.

Western Australia
McIntosh was just 14 when she first represented Western Australia at schoolgirl level in 1969. She then graduated to the under–18 team two years later. Between 1973 and 1986, she was a regular member of the senior Western Australia team that played in the Australian National Netball Championships. The last seven of these  seasons she served as captain-coach.

Australia
Between 1981 and 1986, McIntosh made 29 senior appearances for Australia. She made her senior debut on 23 June 1981. In 1981 she was named the New Idea Australian Netballer of the Year and in 1982 she captained Australia. McIntosh was also a member of the Australia team that won the gold medal at the 1983 World Netball Championships.

Coaching career

Australia
In 1990, McIntosh was appointed head coach of the Australia under-21 team. As a result, she also became a coach with the  Australian Institute of Sport, working with Wilma Shakespear and Gaye Teede. She also relocated to Canberra. In 1991, she became Netball Australia's national coaching director, a role which focused on coach education around Australia. Between 1995 and 2003, McIntosh served as head coach of Australia. During her 94 Tests in charge she guided Australia to 88 victories, achieving a 94% win rate. During this time she guided the team to four gold medals at the 1995 and 1999 World Netball Championships and at the 1998 and 2002 Commonwealth Games.

INF
Since 2005 McIntosh has worked as a coach with the International Netball Federation,  focusing on coach education and development of coaches internationally. She has helped host International Coaching Seminars at both the 2011 and 2015 Netball World Cups.

Central Pulse
In July 2007, McIntosh was appointed director of coaching for Central Pulse as they prepared to make their debut in the 2008 ANZ Championship.

Singapore
In 2009 McIntosh, served as head coach of Singapore at the Netball Singapore Nations Cup. She had worked as an advisor to Netball Singapore since 2004. At the 2011 World Netball Championships she again worked with Singapore as a technical consultant.

Jamaica
Between 2011 and 2015, McIntosh also served three times as a technical director worked with Jamaica. She was a member of Jamaica's coaching team at both the 2014 Commonwealth Games and 2015 Netball World Cup.

Northern Ireland
In May 2012, McIntosh served as head coach of Northern Ireland at the European Netball Championship, guiding them to a silver medal. In July 2012, she was also in charge of Northern Ireland during a three match away series against South Africa.

Jill McIntosh Medal
Since 1994, the West Australian Netball League's Best and fairest player has been awarded the Jill McIntosh Medal. Past winners have included Susan Fuhrmann, Ama Agbeze and Andrea Gilmore.

Honours

Player
Australia
World Netball Championships
Winners: 1983

Head coach
Australia
World Netball Championships
Winners: 1995, 1999
Runner up: 2003
Commonwealth Games
Winners: 1998, 2002
Northern Ireland
European Netball Championship
Runner up: 2012

Individual awards

References

1955 births
Living people
Australian netball players
Australia international netball players
Netball players from Western Australia
West Australian Netball League players
Australian netball coaches
Australia national netball team coaches
Australian Institute of Sport netball coaches
Australian expatriate netball people in New Zealand
Australian expatriate sportspeople in Singapore
Australian expatriate sportspeople in Northern Ireland
Australian expatriates in Jamaica
Australian female butterfly swimmers
Australian female medley swimmers
Recipients of the Australian Sports Medal
Recipients of the Centenary Medal
Sportspeople from Perth, Western Australia
Sport Australia Hall of Fame inductees
1983 World Netball Championships players
Central Pulse coaches